Clinton Township is the name of several places in the U.S. state of Pennsylvania:
Clinton Township, Butler County, Pennsylvania
Clinton Township, Lycoming County, Pennsylvania
Clinton Township, Venango County, Pennsylvania
Clinton Township, Wayne County, Pennsylvania
Clinton Township, Wyoming County, Pennsylvania

Pennsylvania township disambiguation pages